Geißkopf or Geisskopf is the name or part of the name of the following geographic objects:

Mountains and hills (sorted by height):
 Geißkopf (Bregenz Forest Mountains) (1,198 m), in the Bregenz Forest Mountains near Schwarzenberg (Vorarlberg), district of Bregenz, Vorarlberg, Austria
 Geißkopf (1,097.4 m), in the Bavarian Forest near Bischofsmais, county of Regen, Bavaria, Germany
 Geißkopf (Northern Black Forest) (1,085.5 m), in the Black Forest near Seebach (Baden), Ortenaukreis, Baden-Württemberg, Germany
 Geißkopf (Central Black Forest) (359 m), in the Black Forest near Berghaupten, Ortenaukreis, Baden-Württemberg, Germany

Former settlement in Germany:
 Hofruine Geisskopf, ruined forest farming settlement near Iggelbach (Elmstein), county of Bad Dürkheim, Rhineland-Palatinate